Autograf  is an electronic dance music group composed of Jake Carpenter, Louis Kha, and Mikul Wing  specializing in house music. 
Autograf has performed at Coachella, Lollapalooza, EDC Las Vegas and EDC Korea, and headlined shows in Thailand, Indonesia, Brazil, Spain, the Netherlands, France and elsewhere. 
Autograf's debut album, The Ace of You, was released by Armada Music.

Collaborations
Autograf have worked with Halsey, Avicii, and the Chainsmokers, among others.

In popular culture
Autograf's music has been licensed in Netflix's The Innocents, NBC's The Blacklist'', and in ad campaigns for Louis Vuitton and Nike.

References

Electronic dance music groups
Musical trios